Karel Husa (August 7, 1921 – December 14, 2016) was a Czech-born classical composer and conductor, winner of the 1969 Pulitzer Prize for Music and 1993 University of Louisville Grawemeyer Award for Music Composition.  In 1954, he emigrated to the United States and became an American citizen in 1959.

Overview 
Husa learned to play the violin and the piano in early childhood.  After passing his final examination at high school, he enrolled in the Prague Conservatory in 1941, where he studied with Jaroslav Řídký, and attended courses in conducting led by Metod Doležil and Pavel Dědeček.

After the end of the Second World War, Husa was admitted to the graduate school of the Prague Academy, where he attended courses led by Řídký and graduated in 1947.  He then continued composition and conducting studies in Paris.  In 1947, he studied with Arthur Honegger and Nadia Boulanger.  He studied conducting at the École Normale de Musique de Paris and at the  Conservatoire de Paris.  His conducting teachers included Jean Fournet, Eugène Bigot and André Cluytens.  He subsequently divided his career between composing and conducting.

Husa's String Quartet No. 1 received its premiere in June 1950, and won him international attention, as well as the 1950 Lili Boulanger Award and the 1951 Bilthoven Festival Prize.  Other performances in the aftermath of these prizes included the International Society for Contemporary Music in Brussels (1950), festivals in Salzburg (1950), Darmstadt (1951), and the Netherlands (1952) as well as at various concerts in Germany, France, Sweden, England, Switzerland, Australia and the United States.  Other compositions written by Karel Husa during his time in Paris include Divertimento for String Orchestra, Concertino for Piano and Orchestra, Évocations de Slovaquie, Musique d'amateurs, Portrait for String Orchestra, First Symphony, First Sonata for Piano, and Second String Quartet.  Throughout this period, the composer's underlying preoccupation and interest was style, which was primarily influenced by Vítězslav Novák, Leoš Janáček, Béla Bartók and Igor Stravinsky.

From 1954 until 1992, Husa was a professor at Cornell University, eventually holding the Kappa Alpha chair in music.  Composers who studied with Husa include Steven Stucky, Leonard Lehrman, Christopher Rouse, John S. Hilliard, Jerry Amaldev, Christopher Kaufman, Ann Loomis Silsbee, David Conte, and Byron Adams.  He was also a lecturer at Ithaca College from 1967 to 1986, and served as the first Director of the Cayuga Chamber Orchestra from 1977 to 1984.  Husa composed Music for Prague 1968, a work in memory of the 1968 Soviet bloc invasion of Czechoslovakia, which became one of his most celebrated compositions.   His String Quartet No. 3 won the Pulitzer Prize in 1969. Husa was the 1993 recipient of the Grawemeyer Award for Music Composition for his Concerto for Cello and Orchestra.   He was a National Patron of Delta Omicron, an international professional music fraternity.  In 2012, Husa received an honorary Doctor of Fine Arts degree from the University of Louisville.  In his final years, Husa resided in Apex, North Carolina.

Husa and his wife Simone were married for 64 years.  The couple had four daughters, Annette, Catherine, Elizabeth and Caroline.  His widow and daughters survive him.

The Prague Symphony Orchestra is the most professional performer of Husa's symphonic work in his native Czech Republic as he premiered or recorded a number of his compositions. Even with the Prague Symphony Orchestra Karel Husa graduated from the conservatory in 1946. Music for Prague 1968 has become a regular part of the repertoire of the Prague Symphony Orchestra.

Compositions

Ballet

Orchestra

Band

Concertante

Chamber

Keyboard

Vocal

References

External links
 Karel Husa interview, February 11, 1988
 Karel Husa at G. Schirmer
 Karel Husa at Czech Music Information Centre
 Karel Husa at Sigma Alpha Iota
 Chicago Symphony Orchestra, 'From the Archives', 15 December 2016

1921 births
2016 deaths
20th-century classical composers
21st-century classical composers
Concert band composers
Members of the American Academy of Arts and Letters
Pulitzer Prize for Music winners
Czech classical composers
Czech male classical composers
American male classical composers
American classical composers
American people of Bohemian descent
Czechoslovak emigrants to the United States
Musicians from Prague
Recipients of Medal of Merit (Czech Republic)
Distinguished Service to Music Medal recipients
Pupils of Arthur Honegger
21st-century American composers
Cornell University faculty
Ithaca College faculty
20th-century American composers
People from Apex, North Carolina
20th-century American male musicians
21st-century American male musicians
Czechoslovak expatriates in France